Tecoanapa  is a city and seat of the municipality of Tecoanapa, in the state of Guerrero, south-western Mexico.

Notes
The American movie Rambo: First Blood Part II (1985) was filmed in Tecoanapa.

References

Populated places in Guerrero